Sana Khan (born 1988) is an Indian actress, model and dancer.

Sana Khan may also refer to:

Sana Ullah Khan (born 1971), Pakistani politician
Sana Makbul, born Sana Khan, Indian model and actress
Zoya Khan (born 1991), born Sana Khan, Indian actress